Virginia Fabella, M. M. is a Filipina theologian and Maryknoll sister, known for her works in Asian feminist theology and postcolonial theology.

Biography 
Fabella was born in Manila, Philippines. After graduating from the Assumption Convent in Manila and receiving a BS from Mt. St. Vincent College in New York, Fabella joined the Maryknoll Sisters in 1952. She would later receive an MA in Religious Studies from the Maryknoll Seminary in 1980, a Certificate in Pastoral Studies from Union Theological in Chicago in 1988, and a DMin in Women’s Studies from San Francisco Theological Seminary in 1993. Her doctoral dissertation was entitled "The Development of Women's Theological Consciousness within the Ecumenical Association of Third World Theologians."

In the 1970s, Fabella was the program coordinator for the Ecumenical Association of Third World Theologians, later serving as its Asia Coordinator.

Theology 
Fabella is perhaps best known for her authored and edited works on Asian feminist theology and postcolonial theology. In terms of Christology, Fabella has voiced that the maleness of Jesus is not a problem for Asian women, because by being male, "Jesus could more repudiate more effectively the male definition of humanity and show the way to a right and just male–female relationship."

Works

See also 

 Asian feminist theology

References 

World Christianity scholars
Living people
Filipino Roman Catholic theologians
Christian feminist theologians
Year of birth missing (living people)
Maryknoll Sisters
20th-century Filipino Roman Catholic nuns
21st-century Filipino Roman Catholic nuns